Bonaventure is a regional county municipality in the Gaspésie–Îles-de-la-Madeleine region of eastern Quebec, Canada, on the Gaspé Peninsula. Its seat is New Carlisle.

Subdivisions
There are 14 subdivisions within the RCM:

Cities & Towns (3)
Bonaventure
New Richmond
Paspébiac

Municipalities (7)
Caplan
Cascapédia–Saint-Jules
Hope Town
New Carlisle
Saint-Alphonse
Saint-Elzéar
Shigawake

Parishes (1)
Saint-Siméon

Townships (2)
Hope
Saint-Godefroi

Unorganized Territory (1)
Rivière-Bonaventure

Demographics

Population

Language

Transportation

Access Routes
Highways and numbered routes that run through the municipality, including external routes that start or finish at the county border:

Autoroutes
None

Principal Highways

Secondary Highways

External Routes
None

Attractions

Banc-de-Paspébiac Historical Site (Paspébiac)
Bonaventure Airport (Bonaventure)
Canomore Hydro (Saint-Elzéar)
Gaspésie Biopark/Acadian Museum of Quebec (Bonaventure)
Gaspésie British Heritage Centre (New Richmond)
Hamilton House (1852) (New Carlisle)
Pin-Rouge Ski Area (New Richmond)
Saint-Elzéar Cave (Saint-Elzéar)
St-Edgar Covered Bridge (1938) (New Richmond)

Protected Areas
Petite-Cascapédia Wildlife Reserve
Port-Daniel Wildlife Reserve
MLPC Campaign Post
Rivière-Bonaventure ZEC
Rivière-Cascapédia Wildlife Reserve
Rivière-Port-Daniel Wildlife Reserve

See also
 List of regional county municipalities and equivalent territories in Quebec

References

Regional county municipalities in Gaspésie–Îles-de-la-Madeleine
Census divisions of Quebec